Coleophora explorata is a moth of the family Coleophoridae.

The larvae feed on Acanthophyllum species. They feed on the leaves of their host plant.

References

explorata
Moths described in 1992